Every December, British music magazine NME compiles a list of what it considers the best single or track of the year. It was started in 1975. The list is usually published in one of the issues sold before Christmas – in 2006 it was published in the issue for 9 December. The companion list is NME album of the year

The NME Single of the Year list is compiled by the music reviewers and independent journalists who work for the magazine and for NME.com. Each picks his or her top 20 singles of the year and hands them in to the editor. An album marked at Number One gets 20 points, Number Two gets 19 points and so on until the 20th, which gets one point. All of the points from the various top 20s are then gathered together and the overall favourites are worked out and ranked for publication in the official list. The single or track with the most points overall is Number One in the list, the one with the second most points is Number Two and so on. There have been, to date, four artists who have won Album and Single of the Year in the same year: Joy Division in 1980, Klaxons in 2007, MGMT in 2008 and Lorde in 2017. Cecil Womack and Bobby Womack also won Single & Album of the Year respectively in 1984.

Singles of the Year

References

External links
 NME End of year critic lists

New Musical Express
1975 establishments in the United Kingdom
Annual events in the United Kingdom
Awards established in 1975
British music awards
Lists of songs
Recurring events established in 1975